Stephen Demeter (January 27, 1935 – February 3, 2013) was an American professional baseball player and scout. He played in Major League Baseball as a third baseman for two seasons.

Career
Demeter played for the Detroit Tigers in 1959. Prior to the 1960 season he was traded to the Cleveland Indians for Norm Cash. The trade turned out to be one of the most lop-sided trades in Major League Baseball history, as Demeter played only four games for the Indians before being returned to the minor leagues, from which he never returned.  Cash went on to win the 1961 AL batting championship and was one of the top sluggers of the 1960s, hitting 377 career home runs.

Demeter was a fixture of the Rochester Red Wings teams of the mid- to late 1960s, hitting 272 minor league home runs in his long career, and has been inducted into both the Rochester Red Wings Hall of Fame, in 1990, and the International League Hall of Fame, in 2009.

He served one year (in ) as a coach with the MLB Pittsburgh Pirates, working at first base through June 13, and then as bench coach, and also managed for nine seasons in the Pirates' farm system, at the helm of the Sherbrooke Pirates (1972), Salem Pirates (1973; 1976–77), Charleston Charlies (1974–75), Shreveport Captains (1978), and Buffalo Bisons (1979–80).  He also was a roving instructor and scout for the Bucs.

Personal life
Demeter's grandson, Derek Dietrich, is a professional baseball player.

References

External links

Retrosheet
Venezuelan Professional Baseball League

1935 births
2013 deaths
Augusta Tigers players
Baseball players from Pennsylvania
Birmingham Barons players
Buffalo Bisons (minor league) managers
Buffalo Bisons (minor league) players
Charleston Senators players
Cleveland Indians players
Denver Bears players
Detroit Tigers players
Durham Bulls players
Leones del Caracas players
American expatriate baseball players in Venezuela
Major League Baseball third basemen
Minor league baseball managers
People from Homer City, Pennsylvania
Pittsburgh Pirates coaches
Pittsburgh Pirates scouts
Rochester Red Wings players
San Diego Padres scouts
Sherbrooke Pirates players
Syracuse Chiefs players
Toronto Maple Leafs (International League) players
Tulsa Oilers (baseball) players
Wausau Timberjacks players